Whitgift may refer to:

Whitgift, East Riding of Yorkshire, a small village near the confluence of the River Ouse and the River Trent.
 John Whitgift, an English archbishop, who founded or gave his name to:
 the Whitgift Foundation
 the Whitgift Almshouses
 Whitgift School, an independent school in Croydon
 Trinity School of John Whitgift, an independent school in Croydon
 Old Palace School of John Whitgift, an independent school in Croydon
 Whitgift Centre, a shopping centre in Croydon
 Whitgift School, Grimsby, a comprehensive school in Grimsby